Milutin Stefanović (born 23 January 1985) is a Serbian sports shooter. He competed in the men's 10 metre air rifle event at the 2016 Summer Olympics.

References

External links
 

1985 births
Living people
Serbian male sport shooters
Olympic shooters of Serbia
Shooters at the 2016 Summer Olympics
European champions for Serbia
European Games competitors for Serbia
Place of birth missing (living people)
Universiade medalists in shooting
Mediterranean Games gold medalists for Serbia
Mediterranean Games medalists in shooting
Competitors at the 2018 Mediterranean Games
Universiade bronze medalists for Serbia
Shooters at the 2015 European Games
Shooters at the 2019 European Games
Medalists at the 2013 Summer Universiade
Shooters at the 2020 Summer Olympics
21st-century Serbian people